Omiodes martini is a moth in the family Crambidae. It was described by Hans Georg Amsel in 1956 and is found in Venezuela and Costa Rica.

References

Moths described in 1956
martini